is a Japanese actor, film director and musician.

After leaving Dokkyo University without graduating, he started to earn his living as an illustrator, writer and pornographic cartoonist. He joined a theatre called Hakken no Kai in 1978 and he made a screen debut in Zokubutsu Zukan (based on the book by Yasutaka Tsutsui) in 1982. He was also a prominent cult musician in the Tokyo underground scene with his band Bachikaburi in the 1980s and early 1990s.

He is probably most well known to the West as the lead actor in Tetsuo and Tetsuo II directed by Shinya Tsukamoto. He also makes regular appearances in Takashi Miike's films. He became known to the Japanese public as a narrator for the TV documentary series Project X - Challengers which aired between 2000 and 2005 on NHK. Taguchi has directed 3 films, Iden & Tity in 2003, Shikisoku Generation in 2009, and Piece of Cake in 2015.

Filmography

Films

Television

References

External links

Yahoo! Japan profile 

1957 births
Living people
Japanese film directors
Male actors from Tokyo
Dokkyo University alumni